Kristinn Óskar Boris Haraldsson (born 16 March 1980) is an Icelandic strongman competitor. As well as being a multiple holder of Iceland's Strongest Man, he has competed on multiple occasions at the World's Strongest Man.

Biography 
Boris Haraldsson was born in 1980 in Reykjavík in Iceland. At the age of 21 he placed third in Iceland's Strongest Man and despite being absent from the podium from 2002 to 2004 he went on to become four-time champion from 2005 to 2008. These wins in one of the most prestigious national competitions in the strength athletics world qualified him for the World's Strongest Man on each occasion. However, in 2008 he was unable to attend and was out for most of that season due to a serious food poisoning incident and knee surgery. He has two children, a daughter, Elva (born 1998) and a son, Christian (born 2004).

Competition history 
 2001
 3. - Iceland's Strongest Man
 2004
 6. - Iceland's Strongest Man
 2005
 1. - Iceland's Strongest Man
 8. - Strongman Super Series 2005: Varberg
 2006
 1. - Iceland's Strongest Man
 4. - Strongman Super Series 2006: Moscow
 2007
 1. - Iceland's Strongest Man
 8. - World Strongman Cup 2007: Moscow
 9. - Strongman Super Series 2007: Viking Power Challenge
 9. - World Strongman Cup 2007: Dartford
 2008
 1. - Iceland's Strongest Man
 2009
 10. - Giants Live 2009: Mohegan Sun
 2. - Iceland's Strongest Man

References

External links 
 Boris Haraldsson - official site

Haraldsson, Kristinn Óskar
1980 births
Living people